Viveca Monet Woods was one of Nevada's first two African American female lawyers. In 1980, she and Johnnie B. Rawlinson became the first African American females admitted to practice law in Nevada. Woods later served as an Assistant U.S. Attorney in Nevada—becoming the first African American woman to do so.

See also 

 List of first women lawyers and judges in Nevada

References 

Nevada lawyers
American women lawyers
African-American lawyers
Assistant United States Attorneys